Leo Carter DeTray (November 20, 1888 – October 9, 1967) was an American football player and coach of football and basketball.  He served as the head football the Wittenberg University in Springfield, Ohio in 1910, University of Mississippi (Ole Miss) in 1912 and at Knox College in Galesburg, Illinois from 1915 to 1916, compiling a career college football coaching record of 10–7–2.  DeTray was also the head basketball coach at Knox from 1915 to 1917, tallying a mark of 10–10.

DeTray was a letterman at the University of Chicago competing as a halfback during his tenure with the Maroons between 1904 and 1907. 

DeTray began the 1910 season as the head football coach at Wittenberg, but was fired after losing his first two games and replaced by C. J. Longwell. He served as the head football coach at the Ole  Miss in 1912, where he compiled a record of 5–3 during his lone season.

DeTray later worked as a purchasing agent for an oil company based in Texas.  He died on October 9, 1967, at the Little Company of Mary nursing home in San Pierre, Indiana.

Head coaching record

Football

Notes

References

External links
 

1888 births
1967 deaths
American football halfbacks
Basketball coaches from Ohio
Chicago Maroons football coaches
Chicago Maroons football players
Knox Prairie Fire football coaches
Knox Prairie Fire men's basketball coaches
Ole Miss Rebels football coaches
Wittenberg Tigers football coaches
People from Newark, Ohio